List of railway stations in North Korea. Closed stations are not included.

Alphabetical list

References

North Korea
Railway stations
Railway stations